Events from the year 1820 in Germany.

Incumbents

Kingdoms 
 Kingdom of Prussia
 Monarch – Frederick William III of Prussia (16 November 1797 – 7 June 1840)
 Kingdom of Bavaria
 Maximilian I (1 January 1806 – 13 October 1825)
 Kingdom of Saxony
 Frederick Augustus I (20 December 1806 – 5 May 1827)
 Kingdom of Hanover
 George III (25 October 1760 –29 January 1820)
 George IV  (29 January 1820 – 26 June 1830)
 Kingdom of Württemberg
 William (30 October 1816 – 25 June 1864)

Grand Duchies 
 Grand Duke of Baden
 Louis I (8 December 1818 – 30 March 1830)
 Grand Duke of Hesse
 Louis I (14 August 1806 – 6 April 1830)
 Grand Duke of Mecklenburg-Schwerin
 Frederick Francis I– (24 April 1785 – 1 February 1837)
 Grand Duke of Mecklenburg-Strelitz
 George (6 November 1816 – 6 September 1860)
 Grand Duke of Oldenburg
 Wilhelm (6 July 1785 –2 July 1823 ) Due to mental illness, Wilhelm was a duke in name only, with his cousin Peter, Prince-Bishop of Lübeck, acting as regent throughout his entire reign.
 Peter I (2 July 1823 - 21 May 1829)
 Grand Duke of Saxe-Weimar-Eisenach
 Charles Frederick (14 June 1828 - 8 July 1853)

Principalities 
 Schaumburg-Lippe
 George William (13 February 1787 - 1860)
 Schwarzburg-Rudolstadt
 Friedrich Günther (28 April 1807 - 28 June 1867)
 Schwarzburg-Sondershausen
 Günther Friedrich Karl I (14 October 1794 - 19 August 1835)
 Principality of Lippe
 Leopold II (5 November 1802 - 1 January 1851)
 Principality of Reuss-Greiz
 Heinrich XIX (29 January 1817 - 31 October 1836)
 Waldeck and Pyrmont
 George II (9 September 1813 - 15 May 1845)

Duchies 
 Duke of Anhalt-Dessau
 Leopold IV (9 August 1817 - 22 May 1871)
 Duke of Brunswick
 Charles II (16 June 1815 – 9 September 1830)
 Duke of Saxe-Altenburg
 Duke of Saxe-Hildburghausen (1780–1826)  - Frederick
 Duke of Saxe-Coburg and Gotha
 Ernest I (9 December 1806 – 12 November 1826)
 Duke of Saxe-Meiningen
 Bernhard II (24 December 1803 – 20 September 1866)
 Duke of Schleswig-Holstein-Sonderburg-Beck
 Frederick William (25 March 1816 – 6 July 1825)

Events
28 January – German-Russian explorer Fabian Gottlieb von Bellingshausen discovers the continent of Antarctica during the First Russian Antarctic Expedition
15 April – King William I of Württemberg marries his cousin, Pauline Therese, in Stuttgart.
8 June – Constitution of the German Confederation
27 August – German Josef Naus makes the first ascent of Germany's highest mountain, the Zugspitze.
19 November – Congress of Troppau

Births
13 January – Leopold Hoesch, German entrepreneur (died 1899)
16 January – Johannes Rebmann, German missionary (died 1878)
20 January – Wilhelm Paul Corssen, German philologist (died 1875)
22 January – Hermann Lingg, German poet (died 1905)
25 January – Adelbert Heinrich von Baudissin, German writer (died 1871)
23 February – David Kalisch, German playwright and humorist (died 1872)
4 March – Ludwig von Henk, German naval officer (died 1894)
7 April – Amand Goegg, German journalist and politician (died 1897)
10 April – Karl Gustav Ackermann, German politician (died 1901)
11 April – Hermann Knoblauch, German physicist (died 1895)
22 April – Karl Twesten, German politician and writer (died 1870)
2 May – Robert Gerwig, German civil engineer and politician (died 1882)
24 May – Carl Ferdinand Appun, German naturalist (died 1872)
13 June – Julius Faucher, German politician (died 1878)
21 June – Heinrich Burgers, German journalist and politician (died 1878)
27 June – Hermann Abeken, German political writer (died 1854)
11 July – Friedrich von Spiegel, German orientalist (died 1905)
14 July – Sigismund Koelle, German missionary (died 1902)
8 August – Julius Stern, German composer and pedagogue (died 1883)
15 August – Adolph von Pfretzschner, German politician (died 1901)
5 September – Georg Vierling, German composer [died 1901)
15 September – Hermann Heinrich Becker, German politician (died 1885)
27 September – Wilhelm Siegmund Teuffel, German classical scholar (died 1878)
1 October – Ludwig Meyn, Germann agricultural scientist, soil scientist, geologist, journalist, and mineralogist (died 1878)
4 October – Joseph Maximilian von Maillinger, Bavarian General der Infanterie and War Minister (died 1901)
13 October – Hans von Raumer, German politician (died 1851)
23 November – Ludwig von Hagn, German painter (died 1898)
28 November – Friedrich Engels, German social philosopher (died 1895)
29 November – Ferdinand Ludwig Herff, German-American physician  (died 1912)
8 December – Rochus von Liliencron, German Germanist and historian (died 1912)
18 December – Karl Becker, German painter (died 1900)
31 December – Helene Demuth, German housekeeper (died 1890)

Deaths 
10 February – Margravine Elisabeth Louise of Brandenburg-Schwedt, German noblewomen (born 1738)
11 February – Karl von Fischer, German architect (born 1782)
29 February – Johann Joachim Eschenburg, German historian (born 1743)
7 March – Louis Engelbert, 6th Duke of Arenberg, German nobleman (born 1750)
27 March – Gerhard von Kügelgen, German painter (born 1772)
26 April – Christian Zais, German architect (born 1770)
14 May – Paul Struck, German composer (born 1776)
20 May – Karl Ludwig Sand, German university student and member of a liberal Burschenschaft  (born 1795)
1 June – August Ferdinand Bernhardi, German linguist and writer (born 1769)
9 June – Wilhelmine, Gräfin von Lichtenau, German noblewomen (born 1753)
11 July – Frederick Traugott Pursh, German-Canadian botanist (born 1774)
13 September – Princess Adelheid of Anhalt-Bernburg-Schaumburg-Hoym, German noblewomen (born 1800)
19 September – Johann Georg Meusel, German historian (born 1743)
6 December – Karl Christian Tittmann, German protestant theologian (born 1744)
29 December – Princess Pauline of Anhalt-Bernburg, German regent and social reformer (born  1769)

External links 
 Was war wann.de: Das Jahr 1820 (german)

References 

Years of the 19th century in Germany
1820 in Germany
Germany
Germany